Marietta Canty (September 30, 1905 – July 9, 1986) was an American actress, community activist and recipient of numerous humanist awards.

Personal life and social engagement 
Marietta Canty was born in Hartford, Connecticut, the daughter of Mary and Henry Canty, who attended the Metropolitan African Methodist Episcopal Zion Church and actively canvassed for the Republican Party. Marietta Canty herself ran for a seat on the Hartford City Council in the early 1960s. Her awards include the Humanitarian Award, Hartford Section of National Council of Women; and the certificate of Service and Award Recognition by the American Red Cross. The Marietta Canty House, a circa 1897 Queen Anne style house in Hartford, Connecticut, bought by her parents, Mary and Henry Canty in 1930, is named in her honour.

Acting career 
As an actress, Marietta Canty first appeared on Broadway in 1933. She also appeared in 40 films between 1940 and 1955, mostly in supporting roles and bit parts. Like many African-American actresses of her generation, she often played family maids. Two of her first roles were in the films The Lady is Waiting (1942) and The Spoilers (1942), both with Marlene Dietrich in the leading role. Canty is perhaps best known as Delilah, Spencer Tracy's housemaid, in the comedy Father of the Bride (1950) and in its sequel Father's Little Dividend (1951). Canty retired from film acting in 1955, her last role in Hollywood was Rebel Without a Cause starring James Dean, where she had a memorable part as Sal Mineo's family maid.

Filmography

Notes

1905 births
1986 deaths
African-American actresses
American activists
Actresses from Hartford, Connecticut
20th-century African-American women
20th-century African-American people